Erwin Lendvai (4 June 1882, in Budapest – 21 March 1949 in Epsom, Surrey) was a Hungarian composer and choral conductor. He was an uncle of the composer Kamilló Lendvay.

Lendvai was born in Budapest.  He graduated from the National Music Academy of Budapest, studying with Hans von Koessler. He also studied with Giacomo Puccini in Milan. From 1906 on, he lived in Germany, where he began his teaching career. From 1913 to 1914, he taught at the J.-Dalcroze Institute in Hellerau, near Dresden, where he married the photographer Erna Dircksen. From 1914 to 1920, he taught composition at the Klindworth-Scharwenka Conservatory in Berlin and in 1923 choral singing at the Volksmusikschule in Hamburg.

He was also director of a musical society in Koblenz and director of the popular choir of Munich. In 1929, he premiered Arnold Schoenberg's choral work Glück Op. 35, No. 4.

In 1933, he emigrated from Germany due to the Nazi regime and after that worked as a music teacher in Kenninghall, England. After the war, he headed the Györ Conservatory of Music. He became interested in Béla Bartók's music there.

Lendvai wrote one opera, Elga (1916, to a libretto by Gerhart Hauptmann), the festival music Völkerfreiheit (1930), a symphony, Archaic dances, Scherzo for orchestra, 3 Pieces for organ Op. 4, chamber music, choral works and songs. Lendvai's choral music influenced many other choral composers.

References

Sources 
 Erwin Lendvai, Dictionnaire de la musique, Grand Larousse encyclopédique 
 German Wikipedia article
 Italian Wikipedia article

Further reading 
 Hugo Leichtentritt, E. Lendvai. Berlin 1912.
 Gesine Schröder, Zum Streit der Männerchöre in den Zwanziger Jahren: Eine Erinnerung an Erwin Lendvai, in: 4. Tagung AIM Gender in Stuttgart-Hohenheim, 2.-4.2.2006. PDF .
 Gesine Schröder, The Decline of Men's Choir in 20th Century Germany: An Homage to Erwin Lendvai; 2010/2013.

External links 
 
 Texts of his songs
 The Boston Orchestra; A New Symphony by Lendvai Heard at the Fourth Evening Concert," The New York Times, February 21, 1913.
 Listing of some of Lendvai's choral works

20th-century classical composers
Hungarian classical composers
Hungarian male classical composers
Hungarian conductors (music)
Male conductors (music)
Hungarian choral conductors
Hungarian emigrants to Germany
Hungarian emigrants to England
Emigrants from Nazi Germany to the United Kingdom
Hungarian refugees
Musicians from Budapest
1882 births
1949 deaths
20th-century conductors (music)
20th-century Hungarian male musicians